Quercus × bimundorum (or Quercus bimundorum), known as two worlds oak, is a naturally occurring hybrid of white oak, Quercus alba (from the New World), and pedunculate oak, Quercus robur (introduced from the Old World). It occurs sporadically where they come in contact in the United States. Its parents are both placed in Quercus sect. Quercus.

A tree reaching 12m, there are commercial cultivars available, including 'Crimschmidt', trade designation , with a columnar growth form, and 'Midwest', trade designation , with a pyramidal growth form.

References

bimundorum
Plants described in 1948
Plant nothospecies